Events in the year 2019 in Sudan.

Incumbents 
 President: Omar al-Bashir
 Prime Minister: Motazz Moussa
 Vice President: Bakri Hassan Saleh (first), Osman Kebir (second)

Events
Ongoing since December 2018: 2018–2019 Sudanese protests.
War in Darfur continues.

Deaths

17 January – Babiker Awadalla, politician, 8th Prime Minister of Sudan (b. 1917).

References

 
2010s in Sudan
Years of the 21st century in Sudan
Sudan
Sudan